Puerto Rico Highway 23 (PR-23), also known as Franklin Delano Roosevelt Avenue along its entire length, is a main highway in San Juan, Puerto Rico. It begins in PR-2 in Guaynabo near San Patricio and goes east to the business area Milla de Oro, passing through Plaza Las Américas.

Route description

Running 3.84 miles (6.18 km) from Barbosa Avenue in East Hato Rey to San Patricio Avenue in the middle of the city limits of San Juan and Guaynabo, Roosevelt Avenue is densely developed throughout most of its span, connect most residential areas of San Juan, such as Puerto Nuevo, Hato Rey Este, Barrio Obrero, Floral Park, San Jose, and residential and commercial area of San Patricio in Guaynabo. Most of the known shops in San Juan this along Roosevelt Avenue, between these is Plaza Las Americas, the first American-style shopping center in Puerto Rico, and the largest shopping center in Puerto Rico and the Caribbean. Also, Roosevelt Avenue passes just south of the Golden Mile, the main financial district of San Juan. A particular section of the avenue between Hato Rey Puerto Nuevo and West is known as "The center of everything." This section starts from the intersection with Muñoz Rivera Avenue to the bridge is next to the headquarters of the Puerto Rico Police Department.

Transportation
The Roosevelt station of the Tren Urbano is the only station that stops on the avenue. The other station, Hato Rey, stops just a mile ahead due north, at the beginning of the Golden Mile.

The AMA has a bus connection stop at the corner of Roosevelt with  Ponce de León Avenue, and Roosevelt with Muñoz Rivera Avenue, just south of the Golden Mile. The AMA route A-3 stops at this connection, and then returns to Roosevelt Avenue from Plaza Las Americas until the end of the avenue. The A-3 does not runs Roosevelt Avenue from the Muñoz Rivera Avenue to the intersection with Plaza Las Americas Avenue, that's the job for the AMA route B-22 who runs all the Roosevelt Avenue. The AMA route M-2 (Metrobus 2) runs Roosevelt Avenue until the intersection of Muñoz Rivera Avenue.

Neighborhoods

 San Patricio Plaza
 Puerto Nuevo
 Plaza
 Eleanor Roosevelt
 Milla de Oro (Golden Mile)
 Floral Park
 Martín Peña
 El Vedado
 Fomento

Landmarks

 Plaza Las Américas
 Roosevelt Station
 Hiram Bithorn Stadium
 Roberto Clemente Coliseum
 Triple S Plaza
 Puerto Rico Police Department Headquarters
 WKAQ-TV
 WKAQ-FM

Major intersections

See also

 List of highways numbered 23

References

External links
 

023